Debra Ann "Deb" Kolste (née Babl; born June 20, 1953) is an American business owner and politician.  A Democrat, she was a member of the Wisconsin State Assembly from 2013 to 2021, representing the Janesville-based 44th assembly district.

Early life and career
Debra Kolste was born in the small city of O'Neill, Nebraska.  She was co-valedictorian on her graduation from Kimball County High School.  She went on to study at the University of Nebraska and received her bachelor's degree in medical technology in 1975.

She and her husband, Rex, a medical doctor, moved to Colby, Kansas, where they started a medical clinic.  In 1984, they purchased a grain farm in Colby, which Kolste still owns and operates.  In 1994, they sold their clinic in Colby and moved to Janesville, Wisconsin, where they both were employed by Mercy Health.  Since then, Kolste has been employed as a medical technologist in the Mercy Health system.

In Janesville, Kolste quickly became involved in local school affairs as her children matriculated through the Janesville public schools.  She joined the parent–teacher association and, in 2000, she was elected to the local School Board.  She served three three-year terms on the board, leaving office in 2009; she was president of the board for the 2007–2008 session.

Political career
In 2012, Kolste announced she would be a candidate for Wisconsin State Assembly in the Janesville-based 44th assembly district.  She hoped to challenge incumbent first-term Republican state representative Joe Knilans in the general election.  First, however, she had to surmount the crowded Democratic primary field, which included city councilmember Sam Liebert, school board member Kevin Murray, and former city councilmember Yuri Rashkin.  In the August primary, she prevailed with 42% of the vote.  The general election dealt with the issues of a mining bill, which may have had an impact on the Janesville economy, and the state's implementation of the federal Affordable Care Act.  Kolste went on to win a substantial victory over Knilans in the general election, with 61% of the vote.  Kolste won reelection in 2014 and was unopposed in 2016 and 2018.

In February 2020, Kolste announced she would retire from the Assembly at the end of the 2019–2020 term.  Kolste endorsed her friend, Sue Conley, to replace her in the Assembly, and Conley was elected later that year.  Tragically, Kolste's husband, Rex, died unexpectedly two months after she announced her retirement.

Personal life and family
Debra Ann Babl took the name Kolste when she married Dr. Rex J. Kolste, who she met while they were both undergraduate students at the University of Nebraska.  Dr. Kolste, at age 66, died of a heart attack in April 2020.  Rex had suffered his first heart attack at age 50, in 2004, after which they began recreational biking and practiced yoga.  From her marriage with Dr. Kolste, Deb has three adult children, Drew, Ali, and Tori, and three grandchildren.  She resides in Janesville, Wisconsin.

Electoral history

Wisconsin Assembly (2012)

| colspan="6" style="text-align:center;background-color: #e9e9e9;"| Democratic Primary, August 14, 2012

| colspan="6" style="text-align:center;background-color: #e9e9e9;"| General Election, November 6, 2012

Wisconsin Assembly (2014)

| colspan="6" style="text-align:center;background-color: #e9e9e9;"| General Election, November 4, 2014

References

External links
 
 
 Official website
 Representative Debra Kolste at Wisconsin Legislature
 Assembly campaign website (Archived - November 4, 2018)
 44th Assembly District map (2011–2021)

1953 births
Living people
People from O'Neill, Nebraska
Politicians from Janesville, Wisconsin
University of Nebraska alumni
Businesspeople from Wisconsin
School board members in Wisconsin
Women state legislators in Wisconsin
21st-century American politicians
21st-century American women politicians
Democratic Party members of the Wisconsin State Assembly